The  2014 United States Open Championship was the 114th U.S. Open, played June 12–15 at the No. 2 Course of the Pinehurst Resort in Pinehurst, North Carolina.

Martin Kaymer led wire-to-wire to win his first U.S. Open and second major title, eight strokes ahead of runners-up Erik Compton and Rickie Fowler. He was the first to open a major with two rounds of 65 or better, and set a U.S. Open record for lowest 36-hole score at 130. From Germany, Kaymer was the first from continental Europe to win the U.S. Open and the fourth European winner in five years.

Venue
This was the third U.S. Open played at Pinehurst's No. 2 Course and first after the 2010 Coore & Crenshaw restoration which stripped the course of all of its rough and returned it to its original design. The past champions were: Payne Stewart in 1999 and Michael Campbell in 2005. Designed by Donald Ross, the No. 2 Course opened in 1907 and also hosted the PGA Championship in 1936 and the Ryder Cup in 1951.  The course hosted the 2014 U.S. Women's Open the following week, the first time the two championships were played on the same course in the same year.

Course layout
Course No. 2

Lengths of the course for previous U.S. Opens:
2005: , par 70
1999: , par 70

Field
A record 10,127 entries were received.

About half the field consisted of players who were exempt from qualifying for the U.S. Open. Each player is classified according to the first category in which he qualified, and other categories are shown in parentheses.

1. Winners of the U.S. Open Championship during the last ten years
Ángel Cabrera, Lucas Glover, Retief Goosen, Graeme McDowell (13,14), Rory McIlroy (7,9,13,14), Geoff Ogilvy, Justin Rose (11,12,13,14), Webb Simpson (12,13,14)
Michael Campbell withdrew due to being "physically or mentally" unprepared.
Tiger Woods (8,12,13,14) withdrew, as he was recovering from back surgery.

2. Winner and runner-up of the 2013 U.S. Amateur Championship
Matt Fitzpatrick (a,4), Oliver Goss (a)

3. Winner of the 2013 Amateur Championship
Garrick Porteous turned professional in April 2014, forfeiting his exemption.

4. Winner of the 2013 Mark H. McCormack Medal (men's World Amateur Golf Ranking)

5. Winners of the Masters Tournament during the last five years
Phil Mickelson (6,11,12,13,14), Charl Schwartzel (12,13,14), Adam Scott (12,13,14), Bubba Watson (13,14)

6. Winners of The Open Championship during the last five years
Stewart Cink, Darren Clarke, Ernie Els (11,13,14), Louis Oosthuizen (13,14)

7. Winners of the PGA Championship during the last five years
Keegan Bradley (12,13,14), Jason Dufner (11,12,13,14), Martin Kaymer (8,13,14), Yang Yong-eun

8. Winners of The Players Championship during the last three years
Matt Kuchar (12,13,14)

9. Winner of the 2014 European Tour BMW PGA Championship

10. Winner of the 2013 U.S. Senior Open Championship
Kenny Perry

11. The 10 lowest scorers and anyone tying for 10th place at the 2013 U.S. Open Championship
Nicolas Colsaerts, Jason Day (12,13,14), Luke Donald (12,13,14), Gonzalo Fernández-Castaño (13,14), Rickie Fowler (13,14), Billy Horschel (12,13,14), Hunter Mahan (12,13,14), Hideki Matsuyama (13,14), Steve Stricker (12,13,14)

12. Players who qualified for the season-ending 2013 Tour Championship
Roberto Castro, Brendon de Jonge, Graham DeLaet (13,14), Jim Furyk (13,14), Sergio García (13,14), Bill Haas (13,14), Dustin Johnson (13,14), Zach Johnson (13,14), D. A. Points, Brandt Snedeker (13,14), Jordan Spieth (13,14), Henrik Stenson (13,14), Kevin Streelman (13,14), Nick Watney (13), Boo Weekley, Gary Woodland (13,14)

13. The top 60 point leaders and ties as of May 26, 2014, in the Official World Golf Ranking
Jonas Blixt (14), Jamie Donaldson (14), Victor Dubuisson (14), Harris English (14), Matt Every (14), Stephen Gallacher (14), Russell Henley (14), Thongchai Jaidee (14), Miguel Ángel Jiménez (14), Matt Jones (14), Chris Kirk (14), Pablo Larrazábal, Joost Luiten (14), Francesco Molinari (14), Ryan Moore (14), Ryan Palmer (14), Ian Poulter (14), Patrick Reed (14), John Senden (14), Kevin Stadler (14), Brendon Todd (14), Jimmy Walker (14), Lee Westwood (14)
Thomas Bjørn (14) and Richard Sterne (14) withdrew with injuries.

14. The top 60 point leaders and ties as of June 9, 2014, in the Official World Golf Ranking
Kevin Na, Bernd Wiesberger

15. Special exemptions given by the USGA
None

The remaining contestants earned their places through sectional qualifiers.
Japan: Lee Kyoung-hoon, Liang Wenchong, Kiyoshi Miyazato, David Oh, Toru Taniguchi, Azuma Yano
England: Lucas Bjerregaard, Chris Doak, Niclas Fasth, Oliver Fisher, Simon Griffiths (L), Shiv Kapur, Maximilian Kieffer, Brooks Koepka, Tom Lewis, Shane Lowry, Garth Mulroy, Andrea Pavan, Marcel Siem, Graeme Storm
United States
Daly City, California: Steven Alker, Brian Campbell (a,L), Alex Čejka, Maverick McNealy (a,L), Kevin Sutherland
Vero Beach, Florida: Daniel Berger, Andrés Echavarría (L), Nicholas Lindheim (L), Aron Price
Roswell, Georgia: Smylie Kaufman (L), Henrik Norlander
Rockville, Maryland: Chad Collins, Donald Constable (L), Billy Hurley III, Nick Mason (L)
Purchase, New York: Matt Dobyns (L), Rob Oppenheim (L), Fran Quinn (L), Jim Renner
Columbus, Ohio: Robert Allenby, Aaron Baddeley, Ryan Blaum, Paul Casey, Erik Compton, Ken Duke, Luke Guthrie, Kim Hyung-sung, Justin Leonard, Noh Seung-yul, Rod Pampling, Brett Stegmaier, Justin Thomas, Kevin Tway, Bo Van Pelt, Mark Wilson
Springfield, Ohio: Will Grimmer (a,L), Brian Stuard, Chris Thompson (L)
Creswell, Oregon: Zac Blair (L), Clayton Rask (L)
Memphis, Tennessee: David Gossett, Cody Gribble (L), J. B. Holmes, Kevin Kisner, Jeff Maggert, Joe Ogilvie, Robby Shelton (a), Hunter Stewart (a,L), Hudson Swafford, David Toms, Brady Watt (L), Casey Wittenberg
Jason Millard (L) was disqualified after reporting a self-imposed penalty during sectional qualifying.
Houston, Texas: Anthony Broussard (L), Bobby Gates, Cory Whitsett (a)

Alternates who earned entry:
Danny Willett (England) – replaced Tiger Woods
Andrew Dorn (a,L, Springfield) – replaced Thomas Bjørn
Scott Langley (Memphis) – replaced Richard Sterne
Sam Love (L, Memphis) – replaced Jason Millard
Craig Barlow (L, Daly City) – claimed spot held for category 14
Brandon McIver (a,L, Cresswell) – claimed spot held for category 14
Cameron Wilson (a, Purchase) – claimed spot held for category 14

(a) denotes amateur
(L) denotes player advanced through local qualifying

Past champions in the field

Made the cut

Missed the cut

 Tiger Woods (2000, 2002, 2008) and Michael Campbell (2005) did not enter

Nationalities in the field

Round summaries

First round
Thursday, June 12, 2014

Martin Kaymer led the field after shooting a five-under-par 65. He led a group of four golfers, including 2010 champion Graeme McDowell, by three strokes. Only 15 players shot under-par rounds. Defending champion Justin Rose shot 72. The scoring average for the field was 73.23, more than three strokes over par.

Second round
Friday, June 13, 2014

Martin Kaymer recorded a second consecutive round of 65 (−5), establishing a new tournament record for lowest 36-hole score (130) and becoming the first player to open a major championship with two rounds of 65 or better. His six-stroke lead over Brendon Todd after 36 holes tied a tournament record previously set by Tiger Woods in 2000 and Rory McIlroy in 2011. 21 players shot under-par rounds and 13 players were under-par for the tournament. The cut was at 145 (+5) and 67 players made the cut including one amateur, 2013 U.S. Amateur winner Matt Fitzpatrick. The scoring average for the field was 72.89, just less than three strokes over par.

Amateurs: Fitzpatrick (+4), Campbell (+6), Stewart (+6), Whitsett (+6), Wilson (+8), McNealy (+10), Shelton (+13), Goss (+14), McIver (+15), Grimmer (+17), Dorn (+19)

Third round
Saturday, June 14, 2014

Kaymer dropped back towards the field, shooting a 2-over-par 72 but still led by five strokes on a tougher scoring day. Erik Compton and Rickie Fowler shot the only sub-par rounds, both shooting 67 (−3) to move into a tie for second place. Only six golfers remained under-par for the tournament. The scoring average for the field was 73.82, almost four strokes over par.

Final round
Sunday, June 15, 2014

Kaymer shot a 69 in the final round to win by eight strokes over Compton and Fowler. His 72-hole score of 271 was the second-lowest in U.S. Open history. This was his second major championship and also made him the fourth European winner of the event in five years (after Graeme McDowell, Rory McIlroy and Justin Rose) having previously had no European winners since Tony Jacklin in 1970. Eleven golfers shot under-par rounds but none in the last eight groups except Kaymer. Only three golfers finished under-par for the tournament. The scoring average for the field was 72.40, the lowest of any rounds.

Final leaderboard

Scorecard
Final round

Cumulative tournament scores, relative to par

Source:

Media
This was the last U.S. Open for NBC Sports, which had televised the event for twenty consecutive years, 1995–2014. Starting in 2015, Fox Sports began a 12-year contract to televise the championship and other USGA events, which it ended early before the 2020 U.S. Open, where NBC regained coverage due to scheduling conflicts with Fox’s NFL and college football coverage caused by the tournament’s postponement due to the COVID-19 pandemic.

References

External links

United States Golf Association
Coverage on the PGA Tour's official site
Coverage on the European Tour's official site
Coverage on the PGA of America's official site
Pinehurst Resort – official site

U.S. Open (golf)
Golf in North Carolina
U.S. Open
U.S. Open (golf)
U.S. Open (golf)
U.S. Open (golf)